Karel Soucek (April 19, 1947 – January 20, 1985; né Karel Souček) was a Czech professional stuntman living in Canada who went over Niagara Falls in a barrel in 1984. He lived in Hamilton, Ontario.

Soucek prepared for his 1984 Niagara Falls stunt by researching previous attempts, by sending unmanned barrels over the falls to test the currents, and by dropping his barrel off the Niagara Escarpment in Hamilton to test its shock absorbence. It was bright red and bore the words, "Last of the Niagara Daredevils - 1984" and "It's not whether you fail or triumph, it's that you keep your word... and at least try!" In seconds, the barrel was swept over the brink. Shortly after, Soucek emerged bleeding but safe.

Soucek was fined $500 for performing the stunt without a license. He had also spent $15,000 on materials and labor and $30,000 to film the stunt, but quickly earned back all his costs from sales and interviews. Having tasted success, Soucek decided to build a museum at Niagara Falls, Ontario in which to display his stunting paraphernalia.

On January 19, 1985, as Soucek was enclosed in his barrel, 180 feet above the floor of the Astrodome, the barrel was released prematurely and began spinning as it fell toward the floor. Instead of landing in the center of the tank of water, the barrel hit the rim. Foam pads which had been placed at the bottom of the tank to cushion Soucek's fall had floated to the surface before the barrel was released. Soucek, severely injured, was still alive when he was cut from the barrel but died while the Astrodome stunt show was still going on. Stuntman Evel Knievel had tried to persuade Soucek not to go through with the stunt, calling it "the most dangerous I've ever seen".

Soucek is buried at the Drummond Hill Cemetery in Niagara Falls, Ontario, Canada.

See also
Over the Falls in a barrel

External links

References

1947 births
1985 deaths
Accidental deaths from falls
Accidental deaths in Texas
Canadian stunt performers
Czechoslovak emigrants to Canada
Filmed deaths from falls
Filmed deaths in the United States
Inventors killed by their own invention
People who went over Niagara Falls